Breznev Maduaubuchie Ibeh (born August 4, 1983) is a former American football wide receiver and defensive back who played for the Chicago Rush of the Arena Football League. He then played for the Wilkes-Barre/Scranton Pioneers in the 2007 season, and traveled with them to the 2007 af2 Arena Cup in Bossier City, Louisiana. Ibeh joined the South Georgia Wildcats in 2008, and played for the Bossier–Shreveport Battle Wings in 2009. He attended Temple University.

Ibeh was born in Newark, New Jersey. Prior to playing at Temple, Ibeh played two years at Hudson Valley Community College in Troy, New York.

References

1983 births
Living people
American sportspeople of Nigerian descent
Players of American football from Newark, New Jersey
Temple Owls football players
American football defensive backs
American football wide receivers
Chicago Rush players
Hudson Valley Vikings football players
Albany Conquest players
Wilkes-Barre/Scranton Pioneers players
South Georgia Wildcats players
Bossier–Shreveport Battle Wings players